Gold is a compilation album by Steely Dan, released in 1982. It mostly comprises hits both post-dating and not included on their 1978 Greatest Hits, essentially acting as "Volume 2"; it also features additional album tracks, offering a broad perspective on the band's career to that point.

Seven of the tracks are from five of the band's albums from 1973 to 1980; it also includes the non-album single "FM (No Static at All)" (from the soundtrack to the 1978 film FM). Of the album tracks, there are two songs from both Aja and Gaucho, and one track apiece from Countdown to Ecstasy, Katy Lied and The Royal Scam. 

In 1991, the compilation was reissued as the Expanded Edition with four extra tracks - "Here at the Western World" (previously only available on the band's 1978 Greatest Hits compilation), "Century's End" and "True Companion" (two Donald Fagen solo songs from movie soundtracks), and a live version of "Bodhisattva" (originally released as the B-side to the 1980 single "Hey Nineteen"). In addition, the reissue swapped the original "FM" with an alternate version with a saxophone solo replacing the guitar in the song's coda, a version that essentially incorporates the original single's B-side, "FM (Reprise)". Most Steely Dan compilations CDs since then feature this version of "FM", however, Gold (Expanded Edition) is the only place to find this version on vinyl, as it was the last Steely Dan compilation released on the format.

Track listing
All songs by Walter Becker and Donald Fagen, except where noted

Gold (1982)

Side one

Side two

A limited edition of this version was issued in 1982, which contained an additional 4 track 12" disc.

Expanded Edition (1991)

Note: the vinyl and cassette version of the expanded edition have a slightly different track listing. Tracks 1-5 are on Side A, with "Bodhisattva (Live)" at the end of the side, and tracks 6-11 on Side B.

References

1982 greatest hits albums
Steely Dan compilation albums